The Portland Telegram was a daily newspaper serving Portland in the U.S. state of Oregon from 1877 until it was acquired by, and merged into, the Scripps-owned Portland News in 1931. The News had started out as the East Side News under secretive circumstances in 1906. The Telegram was a Democratic paper, despite its founder being a staunch Republican.

History 
The Telegram was founded in 1877 by Henry Pittock, who had founded The Oregonian 16 years prior. His ownership connected the Telegram to the Oregonian; while the Oregonian was a solidly Republican paper, the Telegram tended Democratic, in order to keep competitors out of the field. It is said to have dominated the afternoon news field in Portland until the advent of the Oregon Journal in 1902.

Beginning in the 1850s and '60s, Oregon journalism was characterized by bitter editorial attacks among competing newspaper publishers, a condition referred to as the "Oregon style" of journalism. A. C. McDonald, one of the owners of the Telegram Publishing Company, was killed in a duel with James K. Mercer, assistant editor of the Portland Bee, over an editorial dispute in 1878.

The paper had a high degree of turnover in its leadership in its first decade. One consistent presence was Catherine Amanda Coburn, sister of Harvey W. Scott and Abigail Scott Duniway, who ran the editorial page from 1883 to 1888, when she left for the Oregonian. Richard D. Cannon arrived as editor in 1888, and was credited with improving society and sports coverage. He left the paper in the early 1890s, but returned in 1904. Other editors included J. B. Fithian and S. A. Moreland. Lumbermen John E. and L. R. Wheeler bought the paper in 1914; the Telegram Building, now a historic landmark, was built during their tenure. Several unpopular campaigns, including one against the Ku Klux Klan, brought the paper into bankruptcy. In 1922 an East Oregonian editorial accused the Telegram of opposing the interests of Eastern Oregon and meddling, more than other Portland papers, in electoral politics. C. H. Brockhagen bought the paper, and was the publisher from 1927 until the 1931 merger with the News. According to Oregon newspaper historian George Turnbull, following the merger, the character of the consolidated paper reflected the News more than the Telegram, though the Telegram provided "a number of valuable staff members."

References

External links
 "Research with historical Portland newspapers, beyond the Oregonian" – Multnomah County Library

Newspapers published in Portland, Oregon
Defunct newspapers published in Oregon
Daily newspapers published in the United States
1877 establishments in Oregon
Publications established in 1877